

R

R